was a Japanese Noh actor and playwright of the Konparu school. He was the grandson of Konparu Zenchiku. Zenpō's plays were more popular and dramatic, novel and crowd-pleasing with large casts and more elaborate effects and sets, than the plays of his grandfather's, or his great-grandfather Zeami's, although he did have an appreciation of yugen and wabi (Zenpō was a pupil of Shuko and quoted him as saying "The moon not glimpsed through rifts in clouds holds no interest").

Plays

Arashiyama (嵐山)
Hatsuyuki ("Virgin Snow" or "First Snow"; 初雪; written in the yugen Zenchiku style)
Ikarikazuki ("The Anchor Draping"; 碇潜)
Ikkaku sennin ("One-Horned Wizard"; 一角仙人; this Noh inspired the kabuki play Narukami)
Ikuta Atsumori (生田敦盛)
Kamo (賀茂)
Tōbōsaku (東方朔)

Treatises
Mōtanshichinshō (1455)

Further reading
Four classical Asian plays in modern translation (1972), by Vera Rushforth Irwin. . (Contains a translation of Ikkaku sennin.)
Furyuno no jidai: Konparu Zenpo to sono shuhen ("Komparu Zempo and the age of furyu (spectacle) noh performance"; 1998), by Tomoko Ishii. Published in Tokyo by Tokyo Daigaku Shuppankai;

References

Zempo Zodan (manuscript dated 1553) section 4, in Kodai Chusei Geijutsuron. Cited in Hirota, D. (ed) (1995). Wind in the pines: classic writings of the way of tea as a Buddhist path. Fremont, CA: Asian Humanities Press, 71.

Noh playwrights
1454 births
1520 deaths
15th-century Japanese male actors
16th-century Japanese male actors